is a town located in Ōchi District, Shimane Prefecture, Japan. It is about an hour's drive north of Hiroshima. It was formed on October 1, 2004, from the merger of the towns of Iwami, Mizuho, and the village of Hasumi. As of March 1, 2017, the town has a population of 10,922 and a density of 26 persons per km2.  The area is 419.29 km2.

Iwami Airport in nearby Masuda, Hiroshima Airport and Izumo Airport serve the town.

Geography

Climate
Ōnan has a humid subtropical climate (Köppen climate classification Cfa) with very warm summers and cool winters. Precipitation is abundant throughout the year.

Demographics
Per Japanese census data, the population of Ōnan in 2020 is 10,163 people. Ōnan has been conducting censuses since 1960.

References

External links

Ohnan official website 
Ohnan Tourism Association 
Report on Town Statistical Depiction (Japanese)

Towns in Shimane Prefecture